A champion is a first-place winner in a competition, along with other definitions discussed in the article.

Champion or Champions may also refer to:

Brands and enterprises

 Champion (sportswear), a clothing manufacturer
 Champion (spark plug), a brand of ignition system components
 Champion (supermarket), a defunct French supermarket chain
 Champion (automobile), a German producer of small cars
 Champion Air, defunct American charter airline
 Champion Aircraft, a former light aircraft manufacturer
 Champion Bridge Co., an Ohio-based bridge manufacturer
 Champion Energy, a Houston-based retail electric provider (REP)
 Champion Homes, a modular homes manufacturing company
 Studebaker Champion, an automobile

Art, entertainment, and media

Fictional entities
 Champion of the Universe, a Marvel Comics character
 Champion the Wonder Horse, Gene Autry's horse as portrayed in movies and television shows
 Champions (1975 team), a Marvel Comics superhero team that debuted in 1975
 Champions (2016 team), a Marvel Comics superhero team that debuted in 2016
 The Champion, a transcendent class in the MMORPG Ragnarok Online
 Champions, a group of characters in The Legend of Zelda franchise

Films 
 The Champion (1915 film), a Charlie Chaplin film
 The Champion (1943 film), an Italian film directed by Carlo Borghesio
 Champion (1949 film), an American boxing drama starring Kirk Douglas
 The Champion (1973 film), a Hong Kong film
 The Champions  (1983 film), a Hong Kong film
 Champions (1984 film), a UK film by John Irvin, starring John Hurt, based on the life of Bob Champion
 The Mighty Ducks, 1992 film released as Champions in the UK and Australia
 Champions (1997 film), an American film by Peter Gathings Bunche
 Champion (2000 film), a Hindi film directed by Padam Kumar
 Champion (2002 film), a South Korean film about boxer Duk Koo Kim
 Champion (2003 film), an Indian Bengali film about sports
 Champion (2017 film), an American film starring Gary Graham
 Champion (2018 film), a South Korean film starring Ma Dong-seok
 Champions (2018 film), a Spanish film natively titled Campeones
 Champion (2019 film), an Indian Tamil-language film
 The Champion (2020 film), a Polish-language film
 Champion (2022 film), an Indian Kannada-language film starring Sunny Leone
 Champions (2023 film), an American film starring Woody Harrelson

Television 
 Champion (Canadian TV series), a Canadian sports biography television series
 Champion (British TV series), an upcomingmusical British television series
 Champions (Indian TV series), 2013–2014
 Champions (American TV series), 2018
 The Adventures of Champion (TV series) (1955–1956), a children's TV series (known as Champion the Wonder Horse on British TV)
 The Champions (miniseries), a 1986 Canadian documentary about Pierre Trudeau and René Lévesque
 The Champion (TV series), a 2004 Singaporean Chinese MediaCorp idol drama
 The Champions (1968–1969), a British espionage/science fiction adventure series
America's Got Talent: The Champions (2019-present), a spin-off to the American talent series, America's Got Talent
Britain's Got Talent: The Champions (2019-present), a spin-off to the British talent series, Britain's Got Talent

Games and toys
 Champion, a Beanie Baby bear made by Ty, Inc. 
 Champion, a jumping piece in the game of Omega Chess
 Champions (role-playing game), a game to simulate a superhero comic book world
 Champions Online, a 2009 MMORPG loosely based on the above

Music

Groups and labels
 Champion (band), an American hardcore band
 Champion Records (1925), and its successor label
 Champion Records (1950s), a Nashville, Tennessee-based label
 Champion Records (1980), a British record label

Albums 
 Champion (EP), by Brother Ali
 Champion (Beckah Shae album)
 Champion (Bishop Briggs album)
 Champion (RuPaul album)
 Champion (The Audition album), 2008
 The Champion, an album by Carman
 The Champion: The Hits, a 2009 compilation album by Nigerian rapper ELDee
 Champion (Peter Cornell album), 2014

Songs 
 "Champion" (Ace Hood song)
 "Champion" (Agnes song), a 2006 song by Swedish singer Agnes Carlsson
 "Champion" (Bethel Music and Dante Bowe song), 2020
 "Champion" (Chipmunk song), a 2011 rap song
 "Champion" (Clemens song), 2010
 "Champion" (Clement Marfo & The Frontline song), 2012
 "Champion" (Fall Out Boy song), 2017
 "Champion" (Kanye West song), 2007
 "Champion" (Nicki Minaj song), 2012
 "Champion", a song by Buju Banton from his 2001 compilation album Ultimate Collection (Buju Banton album)
 "Champion", a song by The Chevin from the 2012 album Borderland
 "Champion", coronation song selection for 2015 American Idol XIV runner-up Clark Beckham
 "Champion", a song by Dwayne "DJ" Bravo
 "Champion", a song by Flipsyde
 "Champion", a song by Grinspoon from the 1998 album Guide to Better Living
 "Champions" (GOOD Music song), 2016
 "Champions" (Paid in Full song), 2002
 "Champions" (Usher and Rubén Blades song), 2016
 "Champions", a song by James Blunt from the 2019 album Once Upon a Mind
 "Champions", a song by O.A.R. featuring B.o.B
 "Champions", a song by Sumi Jo
 "The Champion" (song), a song by Carrie Underwood featuring Ludacris, 2018
 "The Champions", a song by DJ Kay Slay from the 2003 album The Streetsweeper, Vol. 1

Periodicals
 The Champion, the magazine of the National Association of Criminal Defense Lawyers
 The Champion Magazine, 1916–1917 magazine founded by Fenton Johnson (poet)
 The Daily Champion, English language newspaper in Nigeria
 The Moree Champion, previously The North West Champion, in Moree, New South Wales
 The Sligo Champion, weekly regional newspaper published in Sligo, Ireland
 The Western Champion (Parkes), weekly newspaper published in Parkes, New South Wales
 The Western Champion (Queensland), weekly newspaper published in Queensland, Australia

Other uses in art and entertainment
 Champion (novel), a 2013 novel by Marie Lu
 Breakfast of Champions, or Goodbye Blue Monday, a 1973 novel and the seventh novel by the American author Kurt Vonnegut
 Champion (opera), a 2013 biographical/philosophical work on Emile Griffith's fatal boxing match 
 "Breakfast of champions", a tagline for Wheaties cereal
 The Champion (story paper), a British comic book which ran from 1922 until 1955

Sports 
 Champion (sportswear), a manufacturer of various classes of clothing
 Champion Stadium, a baseball stadium at Walt Disney World
 Champion Stakes, a thoroughbred horse race in Great Britain
 PGA Champions Tour, a golf circuit for seniors
 The Champions Classic, a golf tournament on the Champions Tour from 1983 to 1985
 Champion (horse) (1797–?), British Thoroughbred racehorse and sire

Titles or roles
 Champion of/for, one who supports or advocates for a cause or constituency, as in patient advocacy
 Queen's Champion, a British office and its incumbent 
 King's Champion, a British office and its incumbent

People with the name
 Champion (surname)
 Champion Jack Dupree (died 1992), American blues pianist
 DJ Champion, stage name of Maxime Morin, a Quebec electronic musician

Places

Canada
 Champion, Alberta

United States
 Champion (VTA), a light rail station in San Jose, California
 Champion, Michigan
 Champion, Nebraska
 Champion, New York
 Champion, Wisconsin
 Champion Township, Michigan
 Champion Township, Minnesota
 Champion Township, Trumbull County, Ohio

Transportation 

 Champion (train), a defunct train service between New York and Florida
 Aeronca Champion, a light aircraft
 Avid Champion, an ultralight aircraft
 HMS Champion, the name of five Royal Navy ships
 USS Champion, the name of several US Navy ships

Other uses
 Champion (apple), a hybrid cultivar crossed in Czech republic
 Champion (role variant), a personality type of the Keirsey Temperament Sorter
 "Champion land", another term for the open field system used in medieval and early modern Europe
 Champion (horse) (1797–?), British Thoroughbred racehorse and sire

See also 
 
 
 Champ (disambiguation)
 Championship
 Champions League (disambiguation)
 Champs (disambiguation)
 Champignon – similar spelling